Peter Lewis Allen (born 1957) is an American former academic, whose research concerns included culture, history, and sexuality.

Education and career
Allen earned a B.A. in classics and English from Haverford College, and a Ph.D. in comparative literature from the University of Chicago.  He taught literature for a time at institutions including Princeton University, the University of Southern California, and Pomona College.  He went back to earn an M.B.A. from the Wharton School in 2000, at which time he left academia for the business world.  He has held positions at McKinsey & Company, at Google University, and at Agoda.

Academic work
Allen's research was around "culture, history, and sexuality".

In 2007, Allen donated his collection of safe sex pamphlets to the Fales Library at NYU.  This collection contains material relating to sexual health issues from 1974-2007.

Books

References

1957 births
Living people
Gender studies academics
Haverford College alumni
University of Chicago alumni
Wharton School of the University of Pennsylvania alumni
University of South Carolina faculty
Pomona College faculty
Princeton University faculty